Rzekuń  is a village in Ostrołęka County, Masovian Voivodeship, in east-central Poland. It is the seat of the gmina (administrative district) called Gmina Rzekuń.

The village has a population of 1,800.

References

Villages in Ostrołęka County